The Joseph Mitchell House is a Gothic, single-family home in Philadelphia, Pennsylvania. It is part of the Tulpehocken Station Historic District. Samuel Sloan allegedly designed this example of a Gothic villa, a style Andrew Jackson Downing popularized. The exterior has a crenellated tower, a slate roof, gingerbread trim and Queen Anne mullioned windows, and the facade is made from Wissahickon schist.

The house sold in 2014 for $525,000.

References

Houses on the National Register of Historic Places in Pennsylvania
National Register of Historic Places in Philadelphia
Houses in Philadelphia
Historic district contributing properties in Pennsylvania